These Tunes Remind Me of You is an album by American jazz pianist Teddy Wilson featuring performances recorded in 1956 for the Verve label.

Reception
Allmusic awarded the album 3 stars.

Track listing
 "Imagination" (Jimmy Van Heusen, Johnny Burke) - 4:04 	
 "The World Is Waiting for the Sunrise" (Ernest Seitz, Eugene Lockhart) - 3:37 	
 "I've Got the World on a String" (Harold Arlen, Ted Koehler) - 3:34
 "Whispering" (Vincent Rose, Richard Coburn, John Schoenberger) - 3:27
 "Poor Butterfly" (Raymond Hubbell, John Golden) - 3:34 	
 "Rosetta" (Earl Hines, Henri Woode) - 4:17
 "Basin Street Blues" (Spencer Williams) - 5:40
 "How Deep Is the Ocean?" (Irving Berlin) - 3:54
 "Just One of Those Things" (Cole Porter) - 4:35
 "Have You Met Miss Jones?" (Richard Rodgers, Lorenz Hart) - 4:02 	
 "It Don't Mean a Thing (If It Ain't Got That Swing)" (Duke Ellington, Irving Mills) - 3:34

Personnel
Teddy Wilson - piano 
Al Lucas – bass
Jo Jones - drums

References

Verve Records albums
Teddy Wilson albums
1959 albums
Albums produced by Norman Granz